Rudolf Hirzel (20 March 1846, Leipzig - 30 December 1917, Jena) was a German classical scholar, and author of a number of major books on Greek law, oaths, dialogues and names.
In Jena Rudolf Hirzel  lived in the same house as  Gottlob Frege and it has been conjectured that his studies in ancient logic may have influenced him.

Works
 De Bonis in fine Philebi enumeratis Dissertatio inauguralis. Leipzig 29.07.1868
 Untersuchungen zu Cicero's philosophischen Schriften 3 vols. (1877–1883)
 De logica Stoicorum. in: Satura philologa. Hermanno Sauppio obtulit amicorum conlegarum decas. (1879) pp. 61–78.
 Der Dialog. Ein literarhistorischer Versuch (1895)
 Der Eid, ein beitrag zu seiner Geschichte (1902)
 Themis, Dike und Verwandtes. Ein Beitrag zur Geschichte der Rechtsidee bei den Griechen (1907)
 Die Strafe der Steinigung (1909)
 Plutarch (1912)
 Die Person. Begriff und Name derselben im Altertum (1914)
 Der Name. Ein Beitrag zu seiner Geschichte im Altertum und besonders bei den Griechen (1918)

References

German classical scholars
1846 births
1917 deaths